Leandro Romiglio (born February 11, 1991 in Mar Del Plata) is an Argentine professional squash player. He reached a career-high world ranking of World No. 103 in April 2010. Romiglio won the bronze medal at the 2015 Pan American Games.

References

External links 

Living people
1991 births
Argentine male squash players
Pan American Games medalists in squash
Pan American Games bronze medalists for Argentina
Squash players at the 2015 Pan American Games
Squash players at the 2019 Pan American Games
South American Games silver medalists for Argentina
South American Games medalists in squash
Competitors at the 2018 South American Games
Sportspeople from Mar del Plata
Medalists at the 2015 Pan American Games
21st-century Argentine people